Tobin (from the Norman surname de St. Aubyn, originated with Saint Albinus) is an Irish surname.

The Anglo-French St. Aubyn family arrived in Ireland in the wake of the Norman invasion in the 12th century and settled in Counties Tipperary and Kilkenny, and subsequently spread to the neighbouring counties of Cork and Waterford.

By the 1440s there were three major Tobin clans established in south east Tipperary, as well as the senior line in Kilkenny. The Tobins were an eminent family in County Tipperary in medieval times, and the head of the family was known as the Baron of Coursey, although this was not an officially recognised title. The 14th century Annals of Ireland, by Kilkenny Franciscan John Clyn, described the Tobins' as 'a turbulent sect more dreaded by the English than the native Irish'. Ballytobin in Co. Kilkenny, Ireland is named after them. It means Tobins' town and may indicate their exact origin.

A branch of the family who were among the Wild Geese settled in Nantes, in the country of origin, and the best known of these was Edmund Marquis de Tobin (1692–1747), who was killed in action in the War of Austrian Succession.

Another branch of the Tobins' settled in Newfoundland and prospered there.

Arts and entertainment
Amon Tobin (born 1972), Brazilian musician
Becca Tobin (born 1986), American actress
Candida Tobin, (1926–2008), British music educator
Christine Tobin (born 1963), Irish singer
Genevieve Tobin (1899–1995), American actress
George Tobin, record producer
George Tobin (American football) (1921–1999), American football player
George Tobin (Royal Navy officer) (1768–1838), British naval officer and artist
George T. Tobin (1864–1956), American illustrator
James Tobin (born 1980), Australian TV personality
Jason Tobin, British-Chinese actor
John Tobin (dramatist) (1770–1804), author of The Honeymoon
Julia Tobin (born 1955), British actress
Louise Tobin (1918–2022), American singer
Niall Tóibín (1929–2019), Irish comedian and actor
Nioclás Tóibín (1928–1994), Irish traditional singer
Orla Tobin, winner of the 2003 Rose of Tralee contest and singer
Steve Tobin (born 1957), American sculptor
Colm Tóibín (born 1955), Irish novelist

Military
John Michael Tobin (1841–1898), American Civil War officer
Liam Tobin (1890–1963), Irish army officer
Marian Tobin (born 1873) Irish War of Independence republican
Paul E. Tobin, Jr. (born c. 1941), rear admiral in the U.S. Navy
Thomas Tate Tobin (1823–1904), American adventurer and US Army scout

Politics
Brian Tobin (born 1954), Canadian Liberal politician
Edmund William Tobin (1865–1938), Canadian politician
James Tobin, George W. Bush's 2004 New England campaign chairman
John M. Tobin (born 1969), American politician
Maurice J. Tobin (1901–1953), U.S. governor and Secretary of Labor
Peadar Tóibín (born 1974), Irish politician
Stanley Tobin (1871–1948), Canadian farmer and politician
Stephen Tobin (1836–1905), Canadian political figure

Religion
Bernadette Tobin, Australian Catholic ethicist
Joseph William Tobin (born 1952), American Roman Catholic archbishop
Mary Luke Tobin (1908–2006), American Roman Catholic nun
Nettie Tobin (1863–1944), American member of the Bahai community
Thomas Joseph Tobin (born 1948), American Roman Catholic bishop

Science 

 William Tobin (1953–2022), British–New Zealand astronomer

Sports
Alex Tobin (born 1965), Australian soccer player
Bert Tobin (1910–1969), Australian cricketer
Bill Tobin (baseball) (1854–1912), major-league baseball first baseman
Bill Tobin (ice hockey) (1895–1963), Canadian ice hockey player and coach
Brendan Toibin (born 1964), American football player
Charlie Tobin (born 1919), Irish hurler
Elgie Tobin, American football coach. Coach of the 1920 Akron Pros, which were the first NFL champions
Frank Tobin, English rugby union footballer who played in the 1860s and 1870s
Frederic Tobin (1849–1914), English cricketer
Jack Tobin (1892–1969), major-league baseball right fielder
Jim Tobin (1912–1969), baseball player
John Tobin (born 1959), Australian rugby league player
Johnny Tobin (1921–1982), baseball player
JP Tobin, (born 1977), New Zealand windsurfer
Kevin Tobin (born 1981), Irish hurler
Pat Tobin (born 1982), Irish hurler
Paul Tobin (1909–2003), American basketball player
Robert Tobin (born 1983), British sprinter
Vince Tobin, (born 1943) American football coach

Other people
Austin Joseph Tobin (1903–1978), executive director of the Port of New York Authority
Ciarán Tobin, Irish citizen involved in a Hungarian legal case
Daniel J. Tobin (1875–1955), American union leader
Desmond Tobin, Irish academic, researcher and author
James Tobin (1918–2002), Nobel Prize-winning economist
Jonathan S. Tobin, American journalist
Joseph Tobin (born 1950), American early childhood education specialist
Laura Tobin (born 1981), British broadcast meteorologist
Margaret Tobin (disambiguation), several people
Martin J. Tobin (born 1951), Irish-American pulmonologist
Neil Tobin (born 1966), American magician
Peter Tobin (1946–2022), Scottish serial killer
Peter J. Tobin (born 1944), American businessman
Robert Deam Tobin (1961–2022), American academic
Thomas Tobin (1807–1881), British businessman
Tony Tobin, celebrity chef
William Tobin (journalist), (1927–2009), news editor

Fictional
A member of the Glanton Gang in the 1985 novel Blood Meridian

See also

Tonin (name)

Surnames of Irish origin